Flaminio Vacca or Vacchi (Caravaggio or Rome, 1538 – Rome, 1605)  was an Italian sculptor.

Biography
His sculptural work can be seen in Rome in the grandiose funeral chapel of Pope Pius V designed by Domenico Fontana at the Basilica di Santa Maria Maggiore (Saint Francis), in the Church of the Gesù (one of four marble angels in the third chapel on the right) and in the right transept of the Chiesa Nuova (Saint John the Evangelist and Saint John the Baptist, both signed). At the notoriously awkward fountain that marked the terminus of the Acqua Felice, Vacca contributed one of the angels (documented 1588–89,) supporting Sixtus V's coat-of-arms that crown the attic, and a bas-relief Joshua Leading His People across the Jordan River; in these commissions for the fountain his partner in the documented payments was Pietro Paolo Olivieri. His self-portrait (1599) is conserved in the Protomoteca Capitolina on the Campidoglio. At the Villa Medici the two marble Medici lions flank the staircase; one is Roman, its pendant, made to match it in 1600, was by Flaminio Vacca. Vacca's copy was replaced by a copy when Villa Medici was sold by the Grand Duke of Tuscany and moved the lions to Piazza della Signoria, Florence, where with its ancient companion it flanks the steps to the Loggia dei Lanzi. In Santa Susanna, the prophets Ezekiel and Daniel have been attributed to him.

Outside Rome his sculpture may be found at Spello (a tabernacle [1587] in the Capella del Sacramento, Church of San Lorenzo);

His Memorie di varie antichità trovate in diversi luogia della Città di Roma (Rome 1594, republished as a supplement to Famiano Nardini's Roma Antica [1666], reprinted by Carlo Fea, 1790) are a primary source of information and rich human detail on the discoveries of Roman sculpture and antiquities in the later sixteenth century, and also on the destruction of antiquities, especially for the urbanistic programmes of Pope Sixtus V. His pithy numbered anecdotal notes consistently begin Mi ricordo..., "I remember...".

Vacca's reputation at the time of his death made him a suitable candidate for insepulture in the Pantheon, Rome; there his modest epitaph reads, in translation, "Flaminius Vacca, Roman sculptor, who in his works never satisfied himself".<ref>"D.O.M. Flaminio Vaccae Sculptori Romano qui in operibus quae facit nunquam sibi satisfecit" The inscription was copied in Bernard Montfaucon's Italian diary, and by a series of references landed Flaminio Vacca eventually in Smith's , Dictionary of Greek and Roman Biography and Mythology (1870), iii. s.v. "Vacca Flaminius", "of whom all that is known is contained in the... inscription".</ref> Vacca had been one of the founding members of the Confraternità dei Virtuosi that was formed at the Pantheon by Desiderio da Segni, a canon of the church of Santa Maria ad Martyres that occupied and preserved the Pantheon, to ensure that worship was maintained in the Chapel of St Joseph in the Holy Land, Others among the first members were Antonio da Sangallo the younger, Jacopo Meneghino, Giovanni Mangone, Taddeo Zuccari and Domenico Beccafumi.

A modern account of his career is Sergio Lombardi, "Flaminio Vacca," in Roma di Sisto V: Le arti e la cultura'', Maria Luisa Madonna, ed. (Rome: De Luca, 1993)

Notes

External links

1538 births
1605 deaths
16th-century Italian sculptors
Italian male sculptors